In the 2002-03 season, U.C. Sampdoria competed in Serie B for a fourth season. They finished the year second behind Siena and were promoted back to Serie A.

Players

First-team squad
Squad at end of season

Left club during season

References

External links
RSSF - Italy 2002/03

U.C. Sampdoria seasons
Sampdoria